In Christian theology, baptism of blood or baptism by blood, also called martyred baptism, is a doctrine which holds that a Christian is able to attain through martyrdom the grace of justification normally attained through baptism by water, without needing to receive baptism by water.

Patristic period 

Cyprian of Carthage in a letter of 256 regarding the question of whether a catechumen seized and killed due to his belief in Jesus Christ "would lose the hope of salvation and the reward of confession, because he had not previously been born again of water", answers that "they certainly are not deprived of the sacrament of baptism who are baptized with the most glorious and greatest baptism of blood".

Cyril of Jerusalem states in his Catechetical Lectures delivered in Lent of 348 that "if any man receive not Baptism, he hath not salvation; except only Martyrs, who even without the water receive the kingdom".

Denominations' opinions

Overview 
This doctrine is held by the Catholic Church, the Oriental Orthodox Churches, the Eastern Orthodox Church, and the American Association of Lutheran Churches.

Lutheranism 
Those who die as Christian martyrs in a persecution of Christians are judged by Anabaptists and Lutherans as having acquired the benefits of baptism without actually undergoing the ritual.

The Augsburg Confession of Lutheranism affirms that "Baptism is normally necessary for salvation". Citing the teaching of the early Church Fathers, Lutherans acknowledge a baptism of blood in "the circumstances of persecution".

Anabaptists 
Those who die as Christian martyrs in a persecution of Christians are judged by Anabaptists as having received the benefits of baptism without actually undergoing the ritual.

Catholic Church 
In the Catholic Church, baptism of blood "replace[s] Sacramental Baptism in so far as the communication of grace is concerned, but do[es] not effect incorporation into the Church, as [it] do[es] not bestow the sacramental character by which a person becomes attached formally to the Church".

Feeneyism 
Feeneyism denies baptism of blood as well as baptism of desire.

See also 

 Baptism of desire

References 

Christian terminology
Baptism
Catholic theology and doctrine